Kava is a surname. Notable people with this surname include:

 Alex Kava (born 1960), American author
 Caroline Kava (born 1949), American actress and playwright
 Eduard Kava (born 1978), Ukrainian Roman Catholic prelate
 Rajesh Kava (born 1979), Indian voice actor
 Vena Kava (born 1986), American artist and vocalist

See also